Vadim Leonidovich Sashurin (born 19 February 1970) is a former Soviet and Belarusian biathlete and current coach. In the lead-up to the 2002–03 season, Sashurin was caught using the banned steroid nandrolone. He was initially banned for 15 months, but the ban was extended to 24 months after Sashurin failed to take part in an anti-doping campaign, as mandated by the IBU.

Biathlon results
All results are sourced from the International Biathlon Union.

Olympic Games

*Pursuit was added as an event in 2002.

World Championships
9 medals (3 gold, 2 silver, 4 bronze)

*During Olympic seasons competitions are only held for those events not included in the Olympic program.
**Team was removed as an event in 1998, and pursuit was added in 1997 with mass start being added in 1999.

Individual victories
2 victories (2 Sp)

*Results are from UIPMB and IBU races which include the Biathlon World Cup, Biathlon World Championships and the Winter Olympic Games.

References

External links
 

1970 births
Living people
People from Petrozavodsk
Soviet male biathletes
Belarusian male biathletes
Biathletes at the 1994 Winter Olympics
Biathletes at the 1998 Winter Olympics
Biathletes at the 2002 Winter Olympics
Olympic biathletes of Belarus
Biathlon World Championships medalists
Belarusian sportspeople in doping cases
Doping cases in biathlon